The Yarra Valley Railway is a heritage railway operating on a section of the former Healesville railway which operated between Lilydale and Healesville in the Yarra Valley area northeast of Melbourne, Australia.

History 

The Lilydale-Melbourne railway was extended from Lilydale to Yarra Flats (now known as Yarra Glen) on the 15 May 1888 with intermediate stations at Coldstream and Yering. Part of the structure included a long timber viaduct with 502 openings near Yarra Glen, spanning the Yarra River and the adjacent flood plains. The extension of the line from Yarra Glen to Healesville required a 1 in 40 (2.5%) climb into a 154.4 metre tunnel with a corresponding descent at nearly the same grade. The Healesville Station opened on 1 March 1889 with an intermediate station at Tarrawarra.

Traffic on the line included timber, livestock, milk and dairy  products.  Early timetables included regular goods services specifically for transporting milk.

The last regular steam passenger service was hauled in August 1964. From this time until closure of the line in 1980 passenger services were run using Rail Motors, initially with Walker railmotors but due to degrading track quality the Walkers were replaced by Diesel Electric Railmotors (DERMs) from 1978 onwards. After 9 December 1980 no services operated beyond Coldstream and the Healesville-Coldstream section of the line was officially closed to all traffic on 10 March 1983. The Healesville Railway Cooperative was established in 1984 to reopen the line and in 1985 was granted an 'Order In Council' for this section by the Victorian State Government to operate the line as a tourist railway. It was partially reopened as far as Yarra Glen for tourist charter services in 1986 following major bridgework. However, these services ceased by 1990 when the Healesville Railway Cooperative merged with the Yarra Valley Tourist Railway, who began running trolley services on the Healesville-Yarra Glen section.

During the Black Saturday bushfires of February 2009 Yarra Glen station came under ember attack and two timber trestle bridges near Tarrawarra were burnt down in a fast-moving grass fire.

Following a track renewal and bridge reconstruction campaign, on 17 July 2010 the official launch of the Walker Railmotor service occurred with the first passenger train service to leave Healesville Railway Station in over 30 years.

Current operations 

The Yarra Valley Railway currently runs a railmotor service from Healesville station to a temporary terminus at the back of the Tarrawarra Estate Winery on Sundays and public holidays, crossing the Watts River, under the Donovans Road overbridge and through the historic tunnel. The Railway is also presently rebuilding the  section from this temporary terminus to Yarra Glen station, including the reconstruction of the Yarra Glen and Tarrawarra stations and the replacement of 14 timber trestle bridges within this section.

There are plans to also run Saturday services with the soon to operational DERM. After the line is restored to Yarra Glen, the Tarrawarra to Healesville Section will temporarily close to allow for extensive track maintenance.

Rollingstock 
The railway is in possession of a number of locomotives and carriages, including the following:

Locomotives

Railmotors & Trailers

Rail Tractors

Carriages

Guards Vans

Line guide 

The Yarra Valley Railway currently runs on a section of track from Healesville to the Tarrawarra Tunnel. The rest of the line between the stop board outside the Tarrawarra Tunnel exit and Yarra Glen is currently being restored.

See also 
 Tourist and Heritage Railways Act

References

External links 
Yarra Valley Tourist Railway
Gallery of historic photos along the Healesville line

Tourist railways in Victoria (Australia)
Heritage railways in Australia
5 ft 3 in gauge railways in Australia
Yarra Valley
1888 establishments in Australia
1983 disestablishments in Australia
Transport in the Shire of Yarra Ranges